Black Pumas is an American psychedelic soul band based in Austin, Texas, led by singer/songwriter Eric Burton and guitarist/producer Adrian Quesada. The group received its first Grammy Award nomination in 2020 for Best New Artist.

History
In 2017, singer and songwriter Eric Burton made his way from California to Texas. Born in the San Fernando Valley, he grew up singing in church and then got heavily involved in musical theater. He started busking at the Santa Monica Pier, where he brought in a few hundred dollars a day and developed his performance skills. Burton traveled through the Western states, studying music at New Mexico State University before deciding to settle down and busk in Austin, Texas.

In the meantime, Grammy Award-winning guitarist and producer Adrian Quesada was looking to collaborate with someone new. Through a mutual friend, Quesada connected with Burton. Quesada felt that Burton's vocals were a match for the retro-funk- and R&B-flavored tracks Quesada had been working on and the two joined forces in 2018 as Black Pumas.

Quesada was a member of Latin funk band Grupo Fantasma when it won the Grammy Award for Best Latin Rock, Urban or Alternative Album for the 2010 album El Existential, and when it was previously nominated for the same award in 2008 for Sonidos Gold.

Working out their material both in the studio and on-stage during a weekly residency at Austin's C-Boys Heart & Soul Bar, they signed a deal with ATO Records and released a pair of singles, "Black Moon Rising" and "Fire".

Career 

The duo released their debut album, Black Pumas, on June 21, 2019. They performed at South by Southwest in 2019 and won a best new band trophy at the 2019 Austin Music Awards. On November 20, 2019, they were nominated for a Grammy Award for Best New Artist.

The album received acclaim from Rolling Stone, who praised "the tireless, charismatic energy of singer Eric Burton", and Pitchfork, who wrote "The duo's flair for drama is so stirring, they can seem acutely cinematic", as well as NPR, The Fader, The Guardian, Billboard, Essence and Headliner Magazine, among others.

Black Pumas made their network TV debut on CBS This Morning  and performed "Colors" on Jimmy Kimmel Live! along with a taping on season 45 of Austin City Limits. The band's single "Colors" later reached number one on AAA radio. The single has been streamed over 100 million times across all platforms. Meanwhile, the official live video of “Colors” has been viewed over 57 million times on YouTube.

In 2020, the band performed on The Ellen DeGeneres Show, The Tonight Show Starring Jimmy Fallon, Late Night with Seth Meyers and The Late Show with Stephen Colbert who premiered their live cover of Tracy Chapman’s "Fast Car".

The band has sold out multiple tours across North America and Europe. In their hometown of Austin, Texas, Black Pumas became the first band to sell out four consecutive shows at Stubbs, one of the city's live venues, and on May 7, 2020, mayor Steve Adler proclaimed the date as Black Pumas Day.

On November 24, 2020, "Colors" received Grammy Award nominations for Record of the Year and Best American Roots Performance, while their self-titled album received a nomination for Album of the Year, at the 63rd Annual Grammy Awards.

In January 2021, then President-elect Joe Biden invited the Black Pumas to perform during his  Celebrating America primetime special during the President's Inauguration activities. Due to the COVID-19 pandemic, the band performed virtually. 

In September 2021, Black Pumas were awarded Duo/Group of the year at the 20th Annual Americana Honors & Awards. On November 23rd, 2021, Black Pumas received two Grammy Award nominations at the 64th Annual Grammy Awards. Nominated twice in the Rock category. This brings their total Grammy nominations up to six. Their “Know You Better (Live From Capitol Studio A)” performance was nominated for Best Rock Performance and their album “Capitol Cuts - Live From Studio A” was nominated for Best Rock Album.

Members 
Eric Burton – vocals, guitar
Adrian Quesada – guitar

Backing band 
Angela Miller – backup vocals, tambourine
Lauren Cervantes – backup vocals
JaRon Marshall – keyboards
Brendan Bond – bass
Stephen Bidwell – drums (WVU Drumline RFL)

Discography

Studio albums

Singles

Awards and nominations

Notes

References

American funk musical groups
American soul musical groups